Echinopsis chamaecereus is a species of cactus from Argentina. Synonyms include Chamaecereus silvestrii and Lobivia silvestrii. It has been called the "peanut cactus", This plant should not be confused with Echinopsis silvestrii, another species with a very different appearance.

In cultivation, E. chamaecereus is hardy to temperatures as low as  if kept dry.

E. chamaecereus was first collected and described in 1896 as Cereus silvestrii by Italian-Argentinian botanist Carlo Luigi Spegazzini in the mountains between the provinces of Tucuman and Salta, Argentina. However, subsequent expeditions to the area failed to find the species Spegazzini had collected and it is unknown whether the species has gone extinct since the initial collection. 

This plant is a recipient of the Royal Horticultural Society's Award of Garden Merit.

References

Flora of Argentina
chamaecereus